In incidence geometry, the Moulton plane is an example of an affine plane in which Desargues's theorem does not hold. It is named after the American astronomer Forest Ray Moulton. The points of the Moulton plane are simply the points in the real plane R2 and the lines are the regular lines as well with the exception that for lines with a negative slope, the slope doubles when they pass the y-axis.

Formal definition
The Moulton plane is an incidence structure , where  denotes the set of points,  the set of lines and  the incidence relation "lies on":

 is just a formal symbol for an element . It is used to describe vertical lines, which you may think of as lines with an infinitely large slope.

The incidence relation is defined as follows:

For  and  we have

Application
The Moulton plane is an affine plane in which Desargues' theorem does not hold. The associated projective plane is consequently non-desarguesian as well.

Notes

References
  
 
Richard S. Millman, George D. Parker: Geometry: A Metric Approach with Models. Springer 1991, pp. 97-104

Incidence geometry